A computer emergency response team (CERT) is an expert group that handles computer security incidents. Alternative names for such groups include computer emergency readiness team and computer security incident response team (CSIRT). A more modern representation of the CSIRT acronym is Cyber Security Incident Response Team.

History
The name "Computer Emergency Response Team" was first used in 1988 by the CERT Coordination Center (CERT-CC) at Carnegie Mellon University (CMU). The term CERT is registered as a trade and service mark by CMU in multiple countries worldwide. CMU encourages the use of Computer Security Incident Response Team (CSIRT) as a generic term for the handling of computer security incidents. CMU licenses the CERT mark to various organizations that are performing the activities of a CSIRT.

The histories of CERT and CSIRT, are linked to the existence of malware, especially computer worms and viruses. Whenever a new technology arrives, its misuse is not long in following. The first worm in the IBM VNET was covered up. Shortly after, a worm hit the Internet on 3 November 1988, when the so-called Morris Worm paralysed a good percentage of it.  This led to the formation of the first computer emergency response team at Carnegie Mellon University under a U.S. Government contract. With the massive growth in the use of information and communications technologies over the subsequent years, the generic term 'CSIRT' refers to an essential part of most large organisations' structures. In many organisations the CSIRT evolves into an information security operations center.

Global associations and teams

National or economic region teams

See also

 Computer security
 Digital humanitarianism
 Emergency prevention
 Proactive cyber defence
 White hat (computer security)
 Critical infrastructure protection
 Incident management
 Information security
 Responsible disclosure
 Vulnerability (computing)

References

External links
 CERT-CC website
 FIRST website

Carnegie Mellon University
Emergency services